Henry George "Hank" Monteith (born October 2, 1945) is a Canadian retired professional ice hockey player who played 77 games in the National Hockey League with the Detroit Red Wings between 1968 and 1971.

Career statistics

Regular season and playoffs

External links

 

1945 births
Living people
Canadian ice hockey left wingers
Detroit Red Wings players
Fort Worth Wings players
Ice hockey people from Ontario
Ontario Hockey Association Senior A League (1890–1979) players
Sportspeople from Stratford, Ontario
Toronto Varsity Blues ice hockey players